The 2011–12 Utah Jazz season is the franchise's 38th overall in the National Basketball Association (NBA), and the 33rd season of the franchise in Salt Lake City.

With a mediocre 36–30 record, the Jazz made the playoffs for the first time since 2010 without Jerry Sloan, who retired last year. However, the Jazz were quickly eliminated from the playoffs as they were overpowered by the San Antonio Spurs, who swept them in four games.

The Jazz would not return to the playoffs until 2017.

Key dates
 June 23: The 2011 NBA draft took place at Prudential Center in Newark, New Jersey.

Draft picks

Roster

Pre-season

Game log

|- bgcolor="ffcccc"
| 1
| December 19
| @ Portland
| 
| Derrick Favors (25)
| Derrick Favors (12)
| Earl Watson (5)
| Rose Garden19,997
| 0–1
|- bgcolor="ccffcc"
| 2
| December 21
| Portland
| 
| C.J. Miles (17)
| C.J. MilesAl Jefferson (9)
| Jamaal TinsleyAl Jefferson (3)
| EnergySolutions Arena15,367
| 1–1

Regular season

Standings

Record vs. opponents

Game log

|- bgcolor=ffcccc
| 1
| December 27
| @ L. A. Lakers
| 
| Paul Millsap (18)
| Enes Kanter (11)
| Devin Harris (6)
| Staples Center18,997
| 0–1
|- bgcolor=ffcccc
| 2
| December 28
| @ Denver
| 
| Al Jefferson (19)
| Derrick Favors (10)
| Gordon Hayward (7)
| Pepsi Center19,155
| 0–2
|- bgcolor=ccffcc
| 3
| December 30
| Philadelphia
| 
| Derrick Favors (20)
| Paul Millsap (14)
| Earl Watson (4)
| EnergySolutions Arena19,911
| 1–2
|- bgcolor=ffcccc
| 4
| December 31
| @ San Antonio
| 
| Al Jefferson (21)
| Al Jefferson (11)
| Gordon Hayward (4)
| AT&T Center17,769
| 1–3

|- bgcolor=ccffcc
| 5
| January 2
| New Orleans
| 
| Al Jefferson (22)
| Al JeffersonPaul Millsap (6)
| Earl Watson (7)
| EnergySolutions Arena19,159
| 2–3
|- bgcolor=ccffcc
| 6
| January 3
| Milwaukee
| 
| Al Jefferson (26)
| Paul Millsap (12)
| Earl Watson (8)
| EnergySolutions Arena17,756
| 3–3
|- bgcolor=ccffcc
| 7
| January 6
| Memphis
| 
| Al Jefferson (20)
| Al Jefferson (9)
| Earl Watson (5)
| EnergySolutions Arena19,503
| 4–3
|- bgcolor=ccffcc
| 8
| January 7
| @ Golden State
| 
| Gordon Hayward (18)
| Derrick Favors (10)
| Devin Harris (8)
| Oracle Arena19,596
| 5–3
|- bgcolor=ccffcc
| 9
| January 10
| Cleveland
| 
| Al Jefferson (30)
| Al Jefferson (12)
| Gordon Hayward (8)
| EnergySolutions Arena17,859
| 6–3
|- bgcolor=ffcccc
| 10
| January 11
| L. A. Lakers
| 
| Paul Millsap (29)
| Al Jefferson (11)
| Devin HarrisGordon Hayward (5)
| EnergySolutions Arena19,642
| 6–4
|- bgcolor=ccffcc
| 11
| January 14
| New Jersey
| 
| Al Jefferson (20)
| Paul Millsap (12)
| Devin Harris (6)
| EnergySolutions Arena19,557
| 7–4
|- bgcolor=ccffcc
| 12
| January 15
| @ Denver
| 
| Paul Millsap (26)
| Al JeffersonPaul Millsap (12)
| Devin HarrisEarl Watson (7)
| Pepsi Center16,208
| 8–4
|- bgcolor=ccffcc
| 13
| January 17
| L. A. Clippers
| 
| Paul Millsap (20)
| Al Jefferson (13)
| Devin HarrisAl Jefferson (4)
| EnergySolutions Arena19,371
| 9–4
|- bgcolor=ffcccc
| 14
| January 19
| Dallas
| 
| Al Jefferson (22)
| Paul Millsap (13)
| Earl Watson (7)
| EnergySolutions Arena19,911
| 9–5
|- bgcolor=ccffcc
| 15
| January 21
| Minnesota
| 
| Paul Millsap (26)
| Al Jefferson (12)
| Earl Watson (7)
| EnergySolutions Arena19,911
| 10–5
|- bgcolor=ffcccc
| 16
| January 25
| Toronto
| 
| Paul Millsap (31)
| Derrick Favors (12)
| Devin Harris (6)
| EnergySolutions Arena19,802
| 10–6
|- bgcolor=ffcccc
| 17
| January 27
| @ Dallas
| 
| Paul Millsap (20)
| Enes KanterPaul Millsap (7)
| Gordon Hayward (6)
| American Airlines Center20,096
| 10–7
|- bgcolor=ccffcc
| 18
| January 28
| Sacramento
| 
| Gordon Hayward (21)
| Paul Millsap (14)
| Devin Harris (6)
| EnergySolutions Arena19,911
| 11–7
|- bgcolor=ccffcc
| 19
| January 30
| Portland
| 
| Paul Millsap (19)
| Paul Millsap (15)
| Three players (4)
| EnergySolutions Arena19,328
| 12–7

|- bgcolor=ffcccc
| 20
| February 1
| L. A. Clippers
| 
| Al Jefferson (27)
| Al Jefferson (12)
| Earl Watson (8)
| EnergySolutions Arena19,637
| 12–8
|- bgcolor=ffcccc
| 21
| February 2
| @ Golden State
| 
| Gordon Hayward (21)
| Paul Millsap (11)
| Jamaal Tinsley (13)
| Oracle Arena18,123
| 12–9
|- bgcolor=ccffcc
| 22
| February 4
| L. A. Lakers
| 
| Al Jefferson (18)
| Al JeffersonPaul Millsap (13)
| Earl Watson (11)
| EnergySolutions Arena19,642
| 13–9
|- bgcolor=ffcccc
| 23
| February 6
| @ New York
| 
| Al Jefferson (22)
| Paul Millsap (13)
| Devin HarrisGordon Hayward (4)
| Madison Square Garden19,763
| 13–10
|- bgcolor=ffcccc
| 24
| February 7
| @ Indiana
| 
| Paul Millsap (18)
| Paul Millsap (10)
| Earl Watson (7)
| Bankers Life Fieldhouse11,006
| 13–11
|- bgcolor=ffcccc
| 25
| February 10
| Oklahoma City
| 
| Al Jefferson (20)
| Paul Millsap (9)
| Devin Harris (7)
| EnergySolutions Arena19,911
| 13–12
|- bgcolor=ccffcc
| 26
| February 12
| @ Memphis
| 
| Gordon Hayward (23)
| Al Jefferson (15)
| Gordon HaywardEarl Watson (5)
| FedExForum14,234
| 14–12
|- bgcolor=ffcccc
| 27
| February 13
| @ New Orleans
| 
| Derrick FavorsAl Jefferson (14)
| Al JeffersonEnes Kanter (12)
| Earl Watson (5)
| New Orleans Arena13,562
| 14–13
|- bgcolor=ffcccc
| 28
| February 14
| @ Oklahoma City
| 
| Al Jefferson (15)
| Paul Millsap (8)
| Earl Watson (6)
| Chesapeake Energy Arena18,203
| 14–14
|- bgcolor=ccffcc
| 29
| February 17
| Washington
| 
| Al Jefferson (34)
| Al JeffersonPaul Millsap (12)
| Devin Harris (9)
| EnergySolutions Arena18,719
| 15–14
|- bgcolor=ffcccc
| 30
| February 19
| @ Houston
| 
| Al Jefferson (23)
| Al Jefferson (11)
| Devin HarrisGordon Hayward (4)
| Toyota Center16,764
| 15–15
|- bgcolor=ffcccc
| 31
| February 20
| San Antonio
| 
| Al Jefferson (20)
| Al JeffersonPaul Millsap (11)
| Devin Harris (4)
| EnergySolutions Arena19,105
| 15–16
|- bgcolor=ffcccc
| 32
| February 22
| @ Minnesota
| 
| Paul Millsap (25)
| Al Jefferson (11)
| Devin Harris (8)
| Target Center18,776
| 15–17
|- align="center"
|colspan="9" bgcolor="#bbcaff"|All-Star Break
|- bgcolor=ffcccc
| 33
| February 28
| @ Sacramento
| 
| Devin Harris (18)
| Derrick Favors (11)
| Devin Harris (7)
| Power Balance Pavilion13,896
| 15–18
|- bgcolor=ccffcc
| 34
| February 29
| Houston
| 
| CJ Miles (27)
| Al Jefferson (10)
| Earl Watson (8)
| EnergySolutions Arena18,816
| 16–18

|- bgcolor=ccffcc
| 35
| March 2
| Miami
| 
| Al Jefferson (20)
| Josh Howard (9)
| Earl Watson (7)
| EnergySolutions Arena19,911
| 17–18
|- bgcolor=ffcccc
| 36
| March 3
| @ Dallas
| 
| Paul Millsap (24)
| Al Jefferson (10)
| Devin Harris (5)
| American Airlines Center20,560
| 17–19
|- bgcolor=ccffcc
| 37
| March 5
| @ Cleveland
| 
| Al Jefferson (25)
| Al Jefferson (13)
| Al Jefferson (7)
| Quicken Loans Arena13,190
| 18–19
|- bgcolor=ccffcc
| 38
| March 7
| @ Charlotte
| 
| Al Jefferson (31)
| Al Jefferson (9)
| Al JeffersonEarl Watson (5)
| Time Warner Cable Arena10,891
| 19–19
|- bgcolor=ffcccc
| 39
| March 9
| @ Philadelphia
| 
| Paul Millsap (15)
| Paul Millsap (9)
| Earl Watson (5)
| Wells Fargo Center18,512
| 19–20
|- bgcolor=ffcccc
| 40
| March 10
| @ Chicago
| 
| Paul Millsap (26)
| Al Jefferson (8)
| Jamaal Tinsley (10)
| United Center22,158
| 19–21
|- bgcolor=ccffcc
| 41
| March 12
| Detroit
| 
| Al Jefferson (33)
| Al Jefferson (12)
| Devin Harris (8)
| EnergySolutions Arena19,393
| 20–21
|- bgcolor=ffcccc
| 42
| March 14
| @ Phoenix
| 
| Al JeffersonPaul Millsap (18)
| Paul Millsap (10)
| Jamaal Tinsley (8)
| US Airways Center14,076
| 20–22
|- bgcolor=ccffcc
| 43
| March 15
| Minnesota
| 
| Gordon Hayward (26)
| Derrick Favors (16)
| Jamaal Tinsley (5)
| EnergySolutions Arena18,053
| 21–22
|- bgcolor=ccffcc
| 44
| March 17
| Golden State
| 
| Derrick Favors (23)
| Derrick Favors (17)
| Devin Harris (5)
| EnergySolutions Arena17,854
| 22–22
|- bgcolor=ccffcc
| 45
| March 18
| @ L. A. Lakers
| 
| Paul Millsap (24)
| Derrick Favors (10)
| Devin Harris (9)
| Staples Center18,997
| 23–22
|- bgcolor=ccffcc
| 46
| March 20
| Oklahoma City
| 
| Paul Millsap (20)
| Derrick Favors (9)
| Devin HarrisAl Jefferson (4)
| EnergySolutions Arena18,138
| 24–22
|- bgcolor=ccffcc
| 47
| March 22
| @ Sacramento
| 
| Al Jefferson (26)
| Derrick Favors (10)
| Jamaal Tinsley (8)
| Power Balance Pavilion11,646
| 25–22
|- bgcolor=ccffcc
| 48
| March 23
| Denver
| 
| Al Jefferson (23)
| Al Jefferson (8)
| Devin Harris (9)
| EnergySolutions Arena19,250
| 26–22
|- bgcolor=ffcccc
| 49
| March 25
| @ Atlanta
| 
| Al Jefferson (28)
| Al Jefferson (17)
| Devin Harris (10)
| Philips Arena13,544
| 26–23
|- bgcolor=ccffcc
| 50
| March 26
| @ New Jersey
| 
| Paul Millsap (24)
| Paul Millsap (13)
| Devin Harris (11)
| Prudential Center10,310
| 27–23
|- bgcolor=ffcccc
| 51
| March 28
| @ Boston
| 
| Gordon Hayward (19)
| Al Jefferson (12)
| Devin Harris (7)
| TD Garden18,624
| 27–24
|- bgcolor=ffcccc
| 52
| March 30
| Sacramento
| 
| Al Jefferson (27)
| Al Jefferson (16)
| Earl Watson (7)
| EnergySolutions Arena19,911
| 27–25
|- bgcolor=ffcccc
| 53
| March 31
| @ L. A. Clippers
| 
| Al Jefferson (26)
| Paul Millsap (9)
| Devin Harris (6)
| Staples Center19,060
| 27–26

|- bgcolor=ccffcc
| 54
| April 2
| @ Portland
| 
| Paul Millsap (31)
| Derrick FavorsPaul Millsap (11)
| Jamaal Tinsley (6)
| Rose Garden20,050
| 28–26
|- bgcolor=ffcccc
| 55
| April 4
| Phoenix
| 
| Paul Millsap (25)
| Gordon Hayward (10)
| Paul Millsap (6)
| EnergySolutions Arena19,911
| 28–27
|- bgcolor=ccffcc
| 56
| April 6
| Golden State
| 
| Al Jefferson (30)
| Al Jefferson (11)
| Earl Watson (6)
| EnergySolutions Arena18,933
| 29–27
|- bgcolor=ffcccc
| 57
| April 8
| @ San Antonio
| 
| Al Jefferson (19)
| Derrick Favors (12)
| Devin Harris (6)
| AT&T Center18,581
| 29–28
|- bgcolor=ccffcc
| 58
| April 9
| San Antonio
| 
| Devin Harris (25)
| Al JeffersonPaul Millsap (10)
| Devin Harris (6)
| EnergySolutions Arena19,911
| 30–28
|- bgcolor=ccffcc
| 59
| April 11
| @ Houston
| 
| Gordon Hayward (29)
| Derrick Favors (11)
| Gordon Hayward (6)
| Toyota Center18,273
| 31–28
|- bgcolor=ffcccc
| 60
| April 13
| @ New Orleans
| 
| Paul Millsap (27)
| Derrick Favors (13)
| Devin Harris (8)
| New Orleans Arena16,326
| 31–29
|- bgcolor=ffcccc
| 61
| April 14
| @ Memphis
| 
| Devin HarrisAl Jefferson (20)
| Derrick Favors (14)
| Devin Harris (6)
| FedExForum17,190
| 31–30
|- bgcolor=ccffcc
| 62
| April 16
| Dallas
| 
| Al Jefferson (28)
| Al Jefferson (26)
| Devin Harris (7)
| EnergySolutions Arena19,363
| 32–30
|- bgcolor=ccffcc
| 63
| April 18
| @ Portland
| 
| Devin Harris (27)
| Al Jefferson (10)
| Alec Burks (5)
| Rose Garden20,545
| 33–30
|- bgcolor=ccffcc
| 64
| April 21
| Orlando
| 
| Devin HarrisAl Jefferson (21)
| Derrick Favors (11)
| Jamaal Tinsley (9)
| EnergySolutions Arena19,580
| 34–30
|- bgcolor=ccffcc
| 65
| April 24
| Phoenix
| 
| Paul Millsap (26)
| Al Jefferson (16)
| Gordon Hayward (8)
| EnergySolutions Arena19,911
| 35–30
|- bgcolor=ccffcc
| 66
| April 26
| Portland
| 
| Alec Burks (18)
| Jeremy EvansEnes Kanter (10)
| Jamaal Tinsley (7)
| EnergySolutions Arena19,554
| 36–30

References

Utah Jazz seasons
Utah Jazz
Utah
Utah